El Hamma is a district in Khenchela Province, Algeria. It was named after its capital, El Hamma.

Municipalities
The district is further divided into 4 municipalities:
El Hamma
Ensigha 
Tamza
Baghai

See also
 Hammam Essalihine

Districts of Khenchela Province